Olsbergs MSE, which also competes under the title OMSE, is an auto racing team founded by Swedish former rally champion Andréas Eriksson as Motorsport Evolution (MSE) in 2005. In 2008 it ran under the name Ford Team RS Europe, while in 2009 Swedish electro-hydraulic control systems manufacturer Olsbergs bought 50% of the team and it was renamed Olsbergs MSE.

The team has been competing in rallycross since its creation, and was backed by Ford Performance until 2015, and again in 2018.

The team is racing in the 2016 and 2017 Global Rallycross series with Honda Civic Coupé's, backed by Honda Performance Development and Red Bull. OMSE is also main Promoter of FIA World Rallycross Championship support RX2 Series (previously RX Lites).

Racecar constructor

Racing record

Complete FIA European Rallycross Championship results
(key)

Division 1

Supercar

Complete FIA World Rallycross Championship results
(key)

Supercar

* Season still in progress.

RX Lites Cup

RX2 International Series

* Season still in progress.

Complete Global Rallycross results
(key)

AWD

Supercar

GRC Lites

Gallery

References

External links

 

Swedish auto racing teams
2005 establishments in Sweden
World Rallycross Championship teams
Red Bull sports teams
Car manufacturers of Sweden
Global RallyCross Championship teams
Racecar constructors
Auto racing teams established in 2005